Prof. P. Venkat Rangan is an Indian computer scientist. He is the current vice chancellor of  Amrita University.  A pioneer of research in Multimedia Systems, he was the founder and director of the Multimedia Laboratory at the University of California, San Diego, where he served as a Professor of Computer Science and Engineering.  By the age of 33 he was one of the youngest full professors at University of California, San Diego.     Dr. Rangan also founded Yodlee Inc. and served as its CEO, for which in 2000, he was selected as one of the 25 best entrepreneurs by the President of the United States of America and featured on the July 2000 cover of Internet World Magazine.

Venkat Rangan has been the recipient of President of India's gold medal from Indian Institute of Technology Madras in 1984. As a Ph.D. student in Computer Science he spent a year at Cornell University, before moving to University of California, Berkeley.  At  Berkeley he secured the top-most rank in the qualifying exams for graduate studies.  In 1988, his Ph.D. thesis at University of California, Berkeley was judged as the outstanding Ph.D of the year by IBM.

Venkat Rangan has been identified by the ACM as a pioneer of research in Multimedia Systems, and for "founding one of the foremost centers for research in multimedia, in which area he is an inventor of fundamental techniques with global impact". With over 100 research papers and 30 patents to his credit, Venkat Rangan has been the driving force behind the setting up of a large number of inter-disciplinary research centers within Amrita University. He has extensively collaborated with international and Indian Govt partners on research projects.

Awards
In his career, Dr. Rangan has won several prestigious awards.  Some of them are:
 Fellow of Association for Computing Machinery (1998)
 NSF National Young Investigator Award (1993)
 The NCR Corporation Research Innovation Award (1991)
 The President of India Gold Medal (1984)

References

External links
 Profile
 Bio

Indian computer scientists
Indian academic administrators
IIT Madras alumni
Cornell University alumni
University of California, San Diego alumni
University of California, Berkeley alumni
University of California, San Diego faculty
Living people
Year of birth missing (living people)